Non-POU domain-containing octamer-binding protein (NonO) is a protein that in humans is encoded by the NONO gene.

The NonO protein belongs to the Drosophila behaviour/human splicing (DBHS) family of proteins. Proteins in the DHBS family include mammalian SFPQ  (splicing factor, proline- and glutamine-rich; a.k.a. PSF), NONO (Non-POU domain-containing octamer-binding protein; a.k.a. p54nrb) and PSPC1 (paraspeckle component 1; a.k.a. PSP1) and invertebrate NONA (Protein no-on-transient A) and Hrp65.

Interactions 

NONO has been shown to interact with SFPQ, SPI1 and Androgen receptor.

Functions 
NONO is involved with many nuclear processes and binds to both DNA and RNA.

As with all proteins of the DBHS familprotein is described as a multifunctional nuclear protein. The NONO protein has been shown to be implicated in many biological functions including, pre-mRNA splicing; activation of transcription; termination of transcription; DNA unwinding and pairing and maintaining correct circadian clock function.

NONO has been identified to bind with Rasd1 protein, in resulting dimer Rasd1 may act to modulate the function of NONO to down regulate the expression of the CREB genes, NR4A1 and Nr4A2.

NONO binds to SFPQ to form a heterodimer that interacts with the MATR3 protein. The interaction of these three proteins may be part of the process in the nucleus that is responsible for the retention of RNAs that are defective, not yet mature enough to be exported or are designed to be retained in nucleus.

Gene location 
NONO protein (Human) is encoded by the NONO gene which is located on the plus strand of the X chromosome.

Role in disease

Melanoma 
NONO has been shown to be more strongly expressed in melanoma cell lines and melanoma tissue samples compared to normal human cell lines and normal skin tissue. Studies have found that the knockout of NONO protein from melanoma cell lines results in both reduced proliferation rates of the cancer cells and a significant decrease in the potential migration of the cancer cells.

Breast cancer 
Studies into breast cancers have found that the loss or alteration of NONO in conjunction with the loss of the estrogen receptor hERα results in more aggressive breast cancers which show an increase in both tumor size and metastases.

Intellectual disability associated with non-compaction cardiomyopathy 
Studies in Humans and mice have identified that NONO null mutations likely lead to the development of a clinically recognizable intellectual disability with cognitive and affective deficits. It was later found that these pathogenic variants were also strongly associated with cardiomyopathy with left ventricular noncompaction and sometimes Ebstein's anomaly.

Structure 
As with other proteins of the DBHS family, NONO protein functions rarely functions alone and primarily forms homo- and heterodimers with other DBHS proteins to perform its various functions. It is theorised that these dimers may have different functions that are specific to the type of cell that they are found in.

It is speculated that it is the phosphorylation state on NONO that acts to direct the proteins many disparate functions within the nucleus.

Tissue specificity 
NONO is found in the nucleus of most mammalian cells and is primarily distributed within the nucleoplasm, it can also be found concentrated within sub-nuclear domains known as paraspeckles.

NONO has also been observed within the brain, localised in the cytoplasm of hippocampal neurons that are associated with RNA transport granules. It is also highly expressed within heart tissue.

Discovery 
NONO protein was first discovered in 1993 by researchers at Cold Springs Harbor Laboratory. Due to the protein being originally identified as a RNA-binding protein it was named p54nrb for Nuclear RNA-binding protein, 54 kDa.

References

Further reading